The Olympic Games are considered to be the world's foremost international sporting event with over 200 nations participating. It historically had the highest costs and expenses for the hosts, with the estimated cost of the 2016 Summer Games in Rio de Janeiro being at approximately US$11.1 billion.

Sports-related costs for the Summer Games since 1960 is on average $5.2 billion (USD) and for the Winter Games $393.1 million dollars. The highest recorded total cost was the 2014 Sochi Winter Olympics, costing approximately US$55 billion. The 2016 Rio de Janeiro Summer Games experienced the biggest loss recorded at approximately $2 billion (USD).

Costs
The current highest cost of hosting the Olympic Games was the 2016 Rio de Janeiro Summer Games, costing approximately US$11.1 billion. In order to meet the requirements set out by the International Olympic Committee (IOC) The Rio de Janeiro council had to invest heavily in building the necessary facilities/venues, and an entirely new subway line. The lack of a solid infrastructure to support these investments led to the council underestimating their costs by 25%.

The costs of hosting the Olympic Games can be classified into 2 categories; infrastructure and operational costs.

Infrastructure

General infrastructure
The costs of general infrastructure consist of preparing the necessary infrastructure to accommodate the influx of tourists and athletes in the host city. The International Olympic Committee requires a minimum of 40,000 hotel rooms available for visiting spectators and an Olympic Village that is able to house 15,000 athletes, referees, and officials.

Internal and external transportation facilities that can transport spectators into and out of the host city and from venue to venue are also required by the Committee. These requirements are often met through renovations to already-built facilities or construction of entirely new facilities. These facilities include train/subway lines, roads, and airports.

Sports infrastructure
The host city is also required by the Olympic Committee to invest in sport-specific infrastructure that meets their requirements. Facilities must reach the specific seating and safety protocols which often require refurbishments, particularly less-used facilities such as natatoriums and velodromes.

Operating costs
Once the necessary infrastructure is put in place, the Olympics require a large amount of spending on operating costs throughout the duration of the Games. Historically, the most significant operating costs for the hosts have been in event management, organization and preparation of the opening and closing ceremonies, and increasingly in recent years, security.

Table
The table below lists the costs of hosting the Olympic Games. Due to the multitude of reporting methods, the table contains both the operating costs and total final costs (which include various infrastructure upgrades and security costs), as well as both known and not estimated figures. Net loss or gain are measured against the operating budgets. Intangible costs (such as to the environment and society) and benefits (through tourism) are not included here.

See also
 List of megaprojects
 Olympic Games

References

External links
 What did Olympics bring Sydney

History of the Olympics
History of finance